PictBridge is a historical computing industry standard introduced in 2003 from the Camera & Imaging Products Association (CIPA) for direct printing. It allows images to be printed directly from digital cameras to a printer, without having to connect the camera to a computer. Its formal name is "Standard of Camera & Imaging Products Association CIPA DC-001 — 2003 Digital Solutions for Imaging Devices". CIPA DC-001-2003 Rev. 2.0 has been published in 2007.

Implementation 

PictBridge is typically implemented using USB ports and the USB protocol. PictBridge-capable printers typically have a USB type A port which is connected by cable to the USB port of a PictBridge-capable digital camera (typically a Mini-B). The user selects the images on the camera to print.

Licensing 

The PictBridge specification is not an open standard; it can only be obtained from CIPA after agreement not to disclose any information from the specification to others. In practice, this means that PictBridge cannot be implemented as free and open source software, other than by reverse-engineering the protocol, if publishing source code of an implementation of the PictBridge standard is considered to count as "disclosing information" from the specification.

A printer may implement functions similar to a PictBridge printer without the non-disclosure agreement merely by treating the camera's memory as a USB mass storage device, although the user interface for image selection would necessarily be on the printer rather than the camera in this case.

See also 

 Picture Transfer Protocol
 Digital Print Order Format
 Mopria Alliance

References

External links 

 CIPA PictBridge Standard Website
 
 CIPA comprehensive list of PictBridge capable printers and cameras

Digital photography
USB